La Marmotte is an annual, one-day cyclosportive event in France for amateur cyclists. It is named after the large ground squirrel that is known to inhabit the slopes of the final climb to the finish in Alpe d'Huez. The first event held in 1982 makes it one of the oldest cyclosportive events of its kind and in France it is often called La Doyenne ("the old lady"), borrowing the nickname given to the professional road race Liège–Bastogne–Liège. The Marmotte remains one of the most popular cyclosportive events today in Europe, with interest in participation exceeding the 7000 places available.

Route
Unlike the other famous French cyclosportive, the Étape du Tour, that has a different route each year, the Marmotte route is fixed. Several famous Tour de France mountains feature; the Col du Glandon, Col du Télégraphe, Col du Galibier and the final ascent of the legendary Alpe d'Huez. Le Le Bourg-d'Oisans hosts the start of the event.

The route for the 2015 edition was changed due to the Tunnel du Chambon (the route off the Galibier to the Alpe) being closed due to cracks being found after a landslide. The altered route included the Lacets de Montvernier and also the ascent of the Col de Croix de Fer via the Col du Mollard (starting from Villargondran). The route was 176 km, including 5,200m of climb.

Organisation

Entry
Online entry on the event's official website is possible but demand greatly exceeds the limited number of places available (approximately 7000). In 2012, the event entry website received more than 6000 individual online applications in one day  and was forced to suspend further online applications. In 2013, entries for the Marmotte Gran Fondo event opened at midnight CET on 30 November. The site was intermittently unusable as the number of requests exceeded what it was capable of handling. Numerous bugs were also apparent as some users were only able to enter by registering as new users.

A limited number places are available to groups, organised sporting holiday companies and individuals who enter the Trophee de l'Oisans, a series of cyclosportive events held in the Oisans region over the previous week, starting with the Vaujany Master ride.

The start and timing
Owing to the sheer number of participants, a staggered start is necessary, with riders batched by race number and those with lower race numbers departing first. The first batch of riders depart at 0700 CET. Priority race numbers are given to a selected number of elite riders who have posted very good times in previous attempts or can provide evidence that they are capable of competing with the best riders. Non-elite riders that have posted good times in the past are also batched in the lower number range. Since timing does not begin until the rider has crossed the start line, theoretically there is no disadvantage to starting from the back of the field. However, since the faster riders depart first it is potentially advantageous to be batched in the earlier groups and take advantage of pelotons moving at greater speeds. In addition, the sheer number of participants can lead to congestion on the roads and at feed stations.

Electronic timing chips given to each rider record the finishing time and split times at various points around the course.

From 2010  the descent of the Col du Glandon was neutralised to discourage riders from descending too recklessly and endangering themselves and other riders. The descent would usually take about 30–35 minutes.

Facilities
Major feed stations are usually placed at the summit of the Col du Glandon, start of the Galibier climb (2 km outside Valloire), summit of the Galibier and at the foot of Alp d'Huez. Intermediary water stops are scattered throughout as are a limited number of temporary toilet facilities.

Statistics

Men's Winners

Men's Lanterne Rouge

References

External links
La Marmotte cyclosportive official website.

Cycling events
Cyclosportives
Cycling in France